Cheonhwangsan (천황산) is name of two  mountains in Gyeongsangnam-do province, South Korea:

Cheonhwangsan (Gyeongsangnam-do/Ulsan) in Gyeongsangnam-do province and the city of Ulsan
Cheonhwangsan (Hapcheon, Gyeongsangnam-do) in the county of Hapcheon, in Gyeongsangnam-do province